Ryall Ayres (1 September 1931 – 24 November 1991) was an Australian cricketer. He played in four first-class matches for Queensland between 1952 and 1960.

See also
 List of Queensland first-class cricketers

References

External links
 

1931 births
1991 deaths
Australian cricketers
Queensland cricketers
Cricketers from Brisbane